The V.F.W. Sports Center is a multi purpose ice arena and recreational facility located in Bismarck, North Dakota owned and operated by the City of Bismarck Parks & Recreation Department. The ice arena serves as the home to the Bismarck Bobcats of the North American Hockey League The facility is also home to several local high school ice hockey teams, local figure skating and curling clubs, youth, and adult recreational ice hockey leagues, as well as public skating.

History
The arena was formerly known as All-Seasons Sports Center and opened in 1986. A second sheet of ice was added in 1999.

References

External links
Official site
Bismarck Bobcats website

Indoor ice hockey venues in the United States
Sports venues in North Dakota
Buildings and structures in Bismarck, North Dakota
Tourist attractions in Bismarck, North Dakota
1986 establishments in North Dakota
Sports venues completed in 1986
Curling venues in the United States
Figure skating venues in the United States